Franco Sbuttoni (born May 6, 1989) is an Argentine professional footballer who plays as a centre-back for Argentine Primera División side Central Córdoba.

Biography  
He debuted in 2009 playing for Tiro Federal, he had little involvement. He went on to Sportivo Belgrano, where it was continued although not scored a goal in each of the two games he played. He also played for Independiente Rivadavia de Mendoza where he scored three goals. Play for Atlético Tucumán.

Club statistics
Updated to 23 February 2017.

References

External links

1989 births
Living people
Argentine people of Italian descent
Argentine footballers
Argentine expatriate footballers
Association football defenders
Tiro Federal footballers
Central Córdoba de Rosario footballers
Sportivo Belgrano footballers
Independiente Rivadavia footballers
Atlético Tucumán footballers
Arsenal de Sarandí footballers
Sagan Tosu players
Central Córdoba de Santiago del Estero footballers
Argentine Primera División players
J1 League players
Expatriate footballers in Japan
Argentine expatriate sportspeople in Japan
Footballers from Buenos Aires